Sahar Ansari, TI (Urdu: سحر انصاری) (Born: 27 Dec 1939, Aurangabad, Maharashtra) is an Urdu poet  and linguist from Karachi, Pakistan. He remained associated with the University of Karachi as Professor and Chairman of Urdu department.

Sahar has been awarded Tamgha-e-Imtiaz by the Government of Pakistan in 2006.

Controversy 
Ansari was found guilty of sexually harassing a fellow female Karachi University Professor in 2018. The alleged harassment incident occurred two years ago and was under investigation by two committees since then.

References

External links
Sahar Ansari at Archive.org
Sahar Ansari at Mushaira.org

Muhajir people
Urdu-language poets from Pakistan
Recipients of Tamgha-e-Imtiaz
Living people
Pakistani scholars
1939 births
People from Aurangabad, Maharashtra